The Bahraini King's Cup is a cup competition involving teams from the Bahraini Premier League and 2nd tier. East Riffa are the current holders of the King's Cup, having defeated Busaiteen in extra time in last year's final. The data is an assessment of how the outcome of the games during the 2015 Bahraini King's Cup.

Draw
The official draw took place on 25 December 2014.

Preliminary round
The winners of the preliminary round qualify for the last 16 elimination round of the tournament.

1st round

Quarter finals

Semi finals

Final

References

Bahraini King's Cup seasons
King's Cup
Bahrain